Bab Jedid, also spelled Bab Djedid or Bab Jdid, is one of the gates of the medina of Tunis.

It is the sixth gate pierced in the ramparts of the medina in 1278, under the reign of Hafsid Sovereign Abu Zakariyâ Yahya al-Wathiq (1277-1279). Opening on the street of the same name, it is also known as the "Gate of the Blacksmiths".

The neighboring district houses many buildings (palaces, large houses and houses), boutiques housing a wide variety of trades, zawiyas and madrasas. Among the bourgeois and aristocratic mansions are Dar El Béji, Dar Djellouli, Dar Zarrouk and Dar Bayram.

It is also known to house the headquarters of the Club Africain.

References

Jedid

Hafsid architecture